= Bandmix =

Musician networking service

BandMix
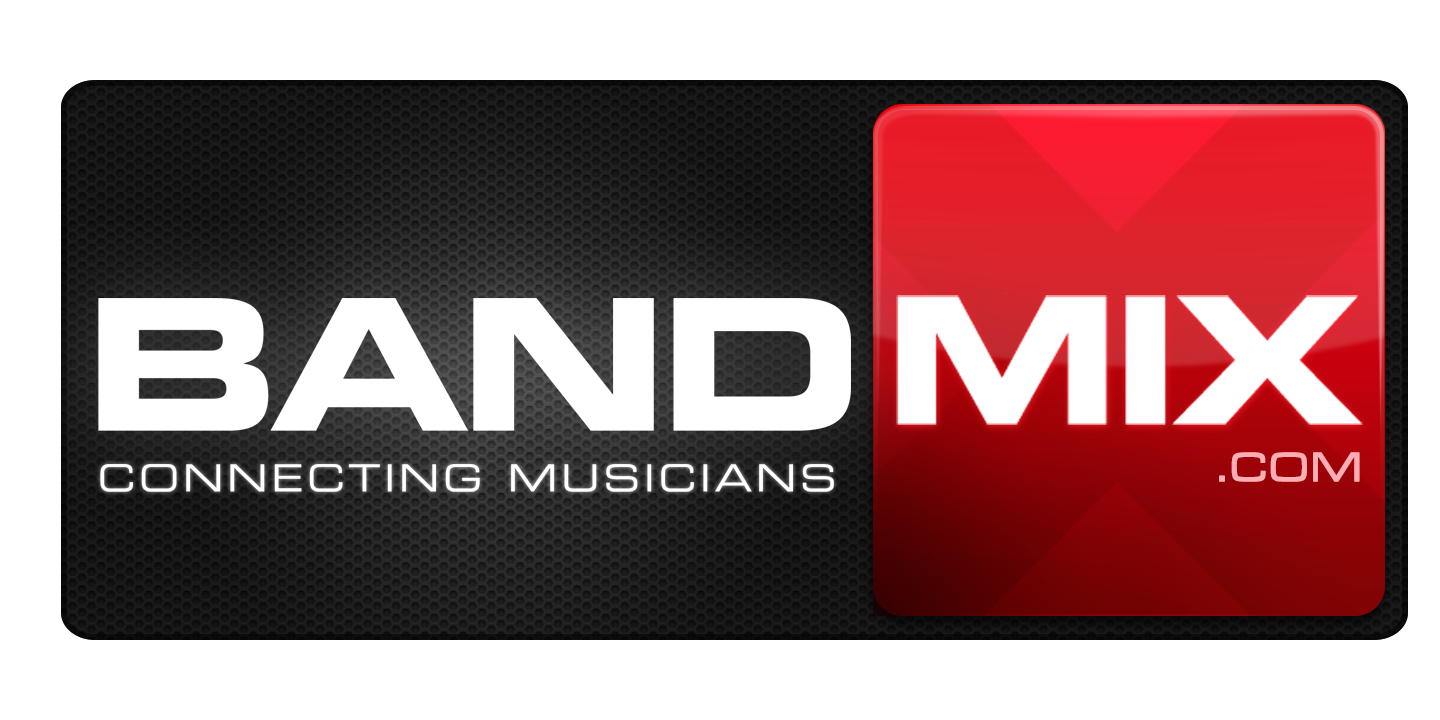
- Website type: Musician Networking
- Owners: Echo Media, Inc.
- Website: https://www.bandmix.com/
- Commercial: Yes
- Registration: Yes
- Launched: 2002
- Current status: Active

Bandmix.com is an online network for connecting local musicians and bands. It currently provides musician services in eight countries and 4 languages. Bandmix's headquarters are in Knoxville, Tennessee and is owned and operated by Echo Media, Inc.

== History ==
Bandmix was founded by Knoxville entrepreneur and musician, David Sales in late 2002 and fully launched in 2004. After graduating from the University of Tennessee, Sales recognized the difficulties of finding and connecting with local musicians who shared similar musical styles and goals. The website was then designed to help musicians and bands connect using online profiles. Originally, Bandmix provided services only to the United States. In 2005, Bandmix expanded to the United Kingdom and Canada. Fellow Tennessee graduate, Robert Hart, joined Echo Media in 2006 to help expand operations and marketing. Bandmix has since added versions in: Australia, Ireland, France, Germany and Spain.

== Services ==
Bandmix's musician classified service is designed to match musicians and bands together. Users can create a profile with details about their musical goals, instrument experience, music preferences, and needs. Additional media including images, audio and YouTube videos can also be added to user profiles.

Users can use Bandmix's search engine to find potential musician and band matches and then communicate using the website's private messaging system. Additionally, Bandmix uses a proprietary algorithm to automatically create match recommendations based on relevant user profile information. These matches are periodically sent to the users and displayed in their account. Bandmix's Digital Audition service allows musicians to target multiple matches at a time through user specified criteria.
